Marshall Arthur Rauch (born February 2, 1923) is an American retired politician in the state of North Carolina.

Biography
A native of New York City, Rauch was born there to Nathan A. and Tillie (Wohl) Rauch. He attended Duke University. Rauch moved to Gastonia in Gaston County, North Carolina, where he was involved in many county, civic and community organizations. In the 1950s and early 1960s, Rauch served on the Gastonia City Council with stints as mayor pro tempore. He married Jeanne Girard in 1946 and has five children. Rauch also owned Rauch Industries Inc. a Christmas ornament company in Gaston County, North Carolina from 1954 to 1998.

In 1967, he was elected to the North Carolina State Senate, representing the 25th district. He served until 1990. Rauch still is the longest-serving Jewish senator in North Carolina history.

In 2013, Rauch was honored by the Gaston County Community Foundation. There is a section of Interstate 85 designated the Senator Marshall Arthur Rauch Highway near Gastonia that is named after him.

Rauch turned 100 on February 2, 2023.

References

1923 births
Living people
21st-century American Jews
Democratic Party North Carolina state senators
North Carolina city council members
Politicians from New York City
People from Gastonia, North Carolina
Mayors of places in North Carolina
Duke University alumni
Jewish mayors of places in the United States
Jewish American people in North Carolina politics
American centenarians
Men centenarians